is a retired Japanese ultramarathon and  marathon runner who won the bronze medal in the marathon at the 1993 World Championships with a time of 2:31:01. Her personal best time is 2:26:09, achieved when she won the 1994 Osaka Ladies' Marathon.

She is the female world record holder in the ultramarathon of 100 kilometres with a time of 6:33:11, which was set on June 25, 2000, at the Lake Saroma Ultramarathon, an official IAAF(International Association of Athletics Federations) race held annually in Hokkaido, Japan.

Achievements

References

1971 births
Living people
Sportspeople from Ōita Prefecture
Japanese female long-distance runners
Japanese ultramarathon runners
Female ultramarathon runners
Japanese female marathon runners
World Athletics Championships athletes for Japan
World Athletics Championships medalists
Japan Championships in Athletics winners
World Athletics record holders
20th-century Japanese women
21st-century Japanese women